WOSU-FM (89.7 FM) is a non-commercial educational radio station licensed to Columbus, Ohio, featuring a public radio news and information format known as "89.7fm NPR News". Owned by The Ohio State University, the station serves the Columbus metro area and has multiple repeaters throughout Ohio, making the station a multiple transmitter station.

WOSU-FM has an effective radiated power (ERP) of 40,000 watts.  Its transmitter is on West Dodridge Road in Columbus, near the Olentangy River.

History

Classical Music
WOSU-FM signed on for the first time on December 13, 1949.  It initially simulcast its sister station, WOSU 820 AM, from sign-on until just after sunset, when the AM station, a daytimer, had to go off the air.  WOSU-FM then broadcast its own programming until signing off at 7:30 pm.  In 1950, the broadcast day was extended to 9:15 pm.  It began 24-hour operation in 1960, and began airing a fully separate schedule on October 1, 1968. The station broadcast an all-classical format from 1980 until 2008.

It was the first station in Columbus to broadcast using HD Radio technology, beginning on April 5, 2004, at 3:30 p.m.  It was also the first station in the United States to begin full-time multicast broadcasting when its HD-2 channel debuted on October 15, 2004.

From January 14, 2008, WOSU-FM switched to a mixed news/classical format, introducing NPR news magazines during morning and afternoon drive times along with several popular NPR weekend programs such as Weekend Edition, Car Talk, and Wait Wait... Don't Tell Me!, plus This American Life from Public Radio International.  Many of these programs were simulcast with sister station WOSU-AM.  WOSU-FM now features a 24-hour-a-day classical music service on its HD-2 digital subchannel as well as on its web site.

News and Information

In Fall 2010, The Ohio State University purchased commercial station 101.1 WWCD.  That station was soon given new call letters – WOSA – and switched to a full-time classical music station.  WOSU-FM then ended most music programming and began simulcasting the NPR news and talk format on WOSU-AM, though the FM station was now branded as the main station.  Four of its satellite stations, WOSB in Marion, WOSE in Coshocton, WOSP in Portsmouth and WOSV in Mansfield were converted to repeaters of WOSA's classical format. In particular, WOSB and WOSV serve areas north of Columbus that do not get a good signal from the 101.1 frequency.

Original programming on WOSU-FM includes daily two-hour public affairs show All Sides with Ann Fisher.  A weekly music program Bluegrass Ramble is also produced by WOSU-FM.

Repeater 
WOSU-FM's signal is repeated on W202CE 89.3 FM in Coshocton.

See also
WOSU
WOSU-TV
WOSA

References

External links 

Radio stations established in 1949
Ohio State Buckeyes media
Ohio State University
OSU
NPR member stations
OSU-FM
1949 establishments in Ohio